Oleksandr Stepanovych Chernetskyi (also transliterated Chernetsʼkyy or Chernetskyy, born February 17, 1984, in Dolyna, Ivano-Frankivsk Oblast) is an amateur Ukrainian Greco-Roman wrestler, who wrestled for the men's super heavyweight category.

Career
He won a bronze medal for his category at the 2006 European Wrestling Championships in Moscow, Russia. He is also a member of the wrestling club at CSKA Kiev, and is coached and trained by his father Stepan Chernetskyi.

Chernetskyi represented Ukraine at the 2008 Summer Olympics in Beijing, where he competed for the men's 120 kg class. He lost the qualifying round match to U.S. wrestler Dremiel Byers, who was able to score three points in two straight periods, leaving Chernetskyi with a single point.

He also competed for Ukraine at the 2016 Summer Olympics.

He competed in the 130kg event at the 2022 World Wrestling Championships held in Belgrade, Serbia.

References

External links
 
 
 
 
 

1984 births
Living people
Ukrainian male sport wrestlers
Olympic wrestlers of Ukraine
Wrestlers at the 2008 Summer Olympics
Wrestlers at the 2016 Summer Olympics
World Wrestling Championships medalists
People from Dolyna
Sportspeople from Ivano-Frankivsk Oblast
20th-century Ukrainian people
21st-century Ukrainian people

Births in Dolyna